A Flying Theater is a themed entertainment technology and adjacent show style. It is a type of simulator ride which consists of one or several motion systems and a large screen. This type of attraction is also known as Panoramic Flying Theaters. The illusion of flight is created through motion that is synchronized with a film. Sound and special effects are combined with the film to create realistic flying experiences.

There are 2 different forms: the suspended Flying Theater, in which rigging similar to a fly system lifts seats into the projection of a film to create the illusion of flight. The other version uses a motion system-based platform with a dome-projection or a large curved screen.

Platform-based Flying Theaters allow 2 different forms of experience: either a traditional seated version and a version where guests are standing on the platform, leaning forward into body-supports to create a ‚fly-like-superman‘-feeling.

History

The concept of Panoramic Flying Theaters as it is understood today was introduced by The Walt Disney Company in 2001 in their „Disney California Adventure“- theme park as „Soarin’ Over California“[3]. The success of „Soarin’ Over California“ initiated a worldwide trend which led to more than 50  Panoramic Flying Theaters built between 2013 and 2021. 

While the steel construction of suspended Flying Theaters, which is necessary to lift the seats with guests into the projection has to be quite large and massive, platform-based Flying Theaters can be operated in a more compact space, thus making both the seated as well as the standing version suitable not only for large installations like "Race Through New York Starring Jimmy Fallon" (Universal Studios Florida) but also for smaller venues like museums (e.g.: „Washington Revelations“ (Museum of The Bible, Washington D.C., shopping malls and family entertainment centers.

List of flying theater attractions

List of companies
Dynamic Structures
Triotech
Falcon's Treehouse
Soaring Attractions (acquired by Viad Corp in 2016)
Dynamic Motion Rides
HUSS Park Attractions

See also
International Association of Amusement Parks and Attractions
Themed Entertainment Association

References

Simulator rides